Chuop Hell (1909 – ca. 1975) was a Cambodian statesman, and President of the National Assembly from 1958 to 1962. He was the acting Head of State of Cambodia from 3 April 1960 until 6 April 1960 and from 13 June 1960 until 20 June 1960.

References 

 

1909 births
1970s deaths
Sangkum politicians
Presidents of the National Assembly (Cambodia)